Asad is a 2012 South African-American short film directed by Bryan Buckley. The film was nominated for the 2012 Academy Award for Best Live Action Short Film.

Produced in South Africa by Mino Jarjoura of Hungry Man Productions, the cast is made up of Somali refugees living in South Africa, none of whom had any acting experience prior to production.

After being nominated for an Oscar, the film was released along with all the other 15 Oscar-nominated short films in theaters by ShortsHD.

Plot
Asad is a fisher boy in Somalia. His friends, led by Laban, are pirates; Asad feels as if he is suited for the pirate life. An old fisherman named Erasto would rather he stick to an honest fishing life as opposed to piracy. Asad has never been able to catch anything on his fishing trips and is beginning to give up hope. Erasto tries to lift his spirits with his largest catch of the day.

When Asad is taking home the fish with his friend various people on the street ask if he has caught it and he angrily tells them that he has not. His friend suggests that he should lie but Asad says that if he does he will be cursed forever and won't catch anything. As they are talking they run into a group of Somali rebels that ask where all the beautiful women in their town are. When Asad's friend says he does not know they threaten to kill him; Asad offers them the fish to save his friend's life.

The next day Asad goes out to the sea to meet with Erasto for a fishing trip and sees the old man injured by the boat. Since Asad had mentioned where the fish came from, the Somali rebels had come for him. Erasto's arm was so badly injured that he could not fish. He tells Asad that the boy's luck will change today and he will finally catch something.

Asad feels the tug of a fish when out at sea and tries to pull it in, but it instead pulls his boat out farther into the sea, where he spies a luxury boat similar to the one that Laban and his friends were going to hold for ransom. Asad goes to see what happened and finds Laban, his friends, and the woman who had the boat all dead. He begins to inspect another room and finds a Persian cat, which he brings back to Erasto. Neither of them know what a cat is, but they say that it looks like a white lion. Erasto marks that Asad's name means "lion". Asad names the cat Lionfish and takes it back to his village to take care of, his luck changed.

Awards

Festival Selections

Tribeca Film Festival
Seattle International Film Festival
Los Angeles Film Festival
Palm Springs International Film Festival
Traverse City Film Festival
Rhode Island Film Festival
HollyShorts Film Festival
One Lens Film Festival
Montreal World Film Festival
Telluride Film Festival
1 Reel Film Festival
Atlantic Film Festival
Raindance Film Festival
Hamptons International Film Festival
Mill Valley Film Festival

New Orleans Film Festival
Austin Film Festival
Ellensburg Film Festival
San Jose International Film Festival
Foyle Film Festival
Denver Film Festival
Evolution Film Festival
Santa Fe Film Festival
Ashbury Shorts Film Festival
Irvine Film Festival
Boulder International Film Festival
Mainly British Film Festival
Sedona Film Festival
San Diego Film Critics Society
Boulder International Film Festival

References

External links

2012 films
2012 short films
2010s short films